Illusive is a self-released 2004 3-song single EP by Israeli oriental death/doom band Distorted, released on June 29, 2004.

Track listing
 "Illusive" - 4:51
 "As You Lay" - 4:08
 "Is It the Wind?" - 3:26

2004 EPs
Distorted albums
Self-released EPs